George Frederick Cooke (1 August 1826 – 25 March 1862) was an English first-class cricketer.

Cooke was born at Manchester in August 1826 and was educated at Rugby School. He made his debut in first-class cricket for Manchester against Sheffield at Manchester in 1848. Cooke played first-class cricket on eighteen occasions from 1848–58. In addition to playing for Manchester, Cooke also appeared for Lancashire and the Marylebone Cricket Club, as well as representing four 'gentlemen' teams: the Gentlemen of England, the Gentlemen of the South, the Gentlemen of the North, and the Gentlemen of Marylebone Cricket Club. In his eighteen matches he scored 356 runs at an average of 10.47, with a high score of 40. With the ball, he took 5 wickets with best figures of 3 for 12. Cooke also stood as an umpire in one first-class match in 1849. He died at Edinburgh in March 1862.

References

External links

1826 births
1862 deaths
Cricketers from Manchester
People educated at Rugby School
English cricketers
Manchester Cricket Club cricketers
Lancashire cricketers
Marylebone Cricket Club cricketers
Gentlemen of the North cricketers
Gentlemen of England cricketers
Gentlemen of Marylebone Cricket Club cricketers
Gentlemen of the South cricketers
English cricket umpires